John Allister "Jack" Currie (February 25, 1868  June 28, 1931) was an Ontario author, journalist and political figure.

Early life

He was born in Nottawa, Ontario in 1862, and was educated at Collingwood Collegiate Institute. After an apprenticeship in the hardware trade, he was hired by the Toronto News, and subsequently became a reporter at the Mail and Empire. Around 1900, following a visit to Rossland, British Columbia, he became a mining broker.

Military service

He was one of the four founding captains of the 48th Highlanders of Canada, which served in South Africa during the Second Boer War, and rose to become its commanding officer. At the beginning of World War I, he offered the Canadian Expeditionary Force the entire regiment, and the offer was accepted. Formally referred to as the "15th Battalion", it became known as the "Red Watch". He was in command at Neuve Chapelle, Ypres, and St Julien.

He was transferred back to Canada in August 1915 under cloudy circumstances, in what came to be known as the "dugout incident," where Currie was said to have been found behind the lines instead of being with his men during the first German gas attack at St Julien. He defended his actions in a speech to the House of Commons of Canada in 1916, and wrote about the battle in his book on his war experiences, but the matter arose again years later when Currie was called as a defence witness in the 1928 libel trial concerning Sir Arthur Currie.

He became commander of the 2nd Brigade at Camp Borden during 19161917.

Political career

Currie ran unsuccessfully for a seat in the House of Commons in 1904. but subsequently won in 1908, and represented Simcoe North in the House as a Conservative and then Unionist member. He was defeated in his bid for reelection in 1921.

Following a by-election in 1922, he subsequently represented Toronto Southeast and then St. Patrick as a Conservative in the Legislative Assembly of Ontario until 1929.

He ran for Mayor of Toronto in the 1924 municipal election placing a poor third.

Death
In 1931, he died at Miami, Florida, following a long illness.

Further reading

Books by Currie

 
 

Other works

References

External links 

 
 

1862 births
1931 deaths
People from Clearview, Ontario
Canadian Militia officers
Canadian Expeditionary Force officers
Conservative Party of Canada (1867–1942) MPs
Members of the House of Commons of Canada from Ontario
Progressive Conservative Party of Ontario MPPs
Unionist Party (Canada) MPs
Ontario municipal politicians
48th Highlanders of Canada